The 2002–03 FIS Ski Jumping World Cup was the 24th World Cup season of ski jumping. It began on 29 November 2002 at Rukatunturi in Kuusamo, Finland, and finished on 23 March 2003 at Letalnica bratov Gorišek in Planica, Slovenia. The defending World Cup champion from the previous two seasons was Adam Małysz, who continued his success by winning the overall title for a third time, as well as his second Nordic Tournament. Sven Hannawald placed second as he did in the previous season, with Andreas Widhölzl in third. Janne Ahonen won the Four Hills Tournament for a second time. The Nations Cup was won by Austria.

On the ski flying hill in Planica, Matti Hautamäki set three consecutive world records – 227.5, 228.5 and 231 metres – in a span of four days, becoming the first ski jumper to officially break the 230 m barrier. Prior to Hautamäki's 231 m jump, Veli-Matti Lindström became the first to unofficially surpass 230 m with a jump of 232.5 m during the 21 March trial round, but his jump was rendered an invalid world record due to him touching the snow with his hand.

Calendar

Individual competitions

 The second competition in Willingen was only a single-round competition.
 Oslo was only a single-round competition.

Team competitions

Final standings

Overall

Four Hills Tournament

Nordic Tournament

Prize money

Nations Cup

World records

Medal table

References

External links

World cup
World cup
FIS Ski Jumping World Cup